The 2014 Africa Magic Viewers Choice Awards was held on March 8, 2014 at the Eko Hotel and Suites, Victoria Island, Lagos, Nigeria. Osas Ighodaro, IK and Vimbai were the hosts of the event.

References

Entertainment events in Nigeria
2014 in Nigerian cinema
Africa Magic
21st century in Lagos
Africa Magic Viewers' Choice Awards ceremonies